UC-61 may refer to:

 , a World War I German coastal minelaying submarine
 Fairchild 24, an airplane with a United States military designation of "UC-61"